= Holy person =

Holy person may refer to:

- One of the three "Persons" of the Holy Trinity in Christianity
- A saint or other pious person
